Trinidad is the capital city of Flores in southern Uruguay. It has a population of 21,429 (National Census 2011). Formerly it was called Santísima Trinidad de los Porongos, or simply Porongos. Its inhabitants are known as trinitarios or also as porongueros because the city is located near the Porongos stream.

Geography
Trinidad is located in the central area of Flores department, on Cuchilla Porongos, between the Sarandí and Porongos streams and on the intersection of Route 3 with Route 14.

History
Initially it was called "Porongos". Even to this day, the inhabitants of the city are referred to as either 'trinitarios' or 'porongueros'.

Porongos was founded on 18 July 1805 by General José Gervasio Artigas, the Uruguayan independence leader. It had acquired the status of "Pueblo" (village) before the Independence of Uruguay. It reached the status of "Villa" (town) under the name "Villa de Porongos". It was renamed to "Villa de la Santísima Trinidad" (Most Holy Trinity) and became capital of the newly created Department of Flores on 30 December 1885 by the Act of Ley Nº 1.854. Its naming reflects a less secular period in the country's history.

In July 1903 it was renamed "Trinidad" and its status was elevated to "Ciudad" (city) by the Act of Ley Nº 2.829.

Population
In 2011, Trinidad had a population of 21,429. This makes Trinidad the largest city by far in the department of Flores.
 
Source: Instituto Nacional de Estadística de Uruguay

Tourism 

Nearby there are interesting prehistoric sites to visit: the Palace Cave and the rock paintings at Chamangá.

Places of worship
 Most Holy Trinity Parish Church (Roman Catholic)
 Our Lady of Luján Parish Church (Roman Catholic)

Politics
Following a sizeable meeting in Trinidad in 2007, the 'Vamos Uruguay' grouping within the Colorado Party was founded by Pedro Bordaberry Herrán, the front-running Presidential candidate of the Colorados for 2009. Following these beginnings in Trinidad, local chapters of the organization were subsequently established in many departments of Uruguay.

Notable people
Chory Castro (born 1984), football player

See also
 Porongos River#Name
 Flores Department#Fauna
 :es:Arroyo Porongos
 :es:Categoría:Poronguero

References

External links

Official site of Flores department
INE map of Trinidad

Populated places in the Flores Department
Populated places established in 1805
1805 establishments in the Spanish Empire